Longwood may refer to:

Australia
 Longwood, Victoria

India
 Longwood, Shimla

New Zealand
 Longwood, New Zealand

Republic of Ireland
 Longwood, County Meath

United Kingdom
 Longwood, West Yorkshire, England
 Longwood, Saint Helena, location of Napoleon's second exile

United States
 Longwood, Florida
 Longwood Historic District (Longwood, Florida)
 Longwood (Baton Rouge, Louisiana)
 Longwood (Glenwood, Maryland), a historic plantation
 Longwood Medical and Academic Area in Boston, Massachusetts
 Longwood Historic District (Brookline, Massachusetts)
 Longwood Cricket Club in Chestnut Hill, Massachusetts
 Longwood (Natchez, Mississippi), an antebellum mansion
 Longwood, Missouri
 Longwood, Bronx, New York
 Longwood Historic District (Bronx, New York)
 Longwood Central School District, Long Island, New York
 The Longwood Estate, part of Manor St. George in Ridge, New York
 Longwood (Milton, North Carolina)
 Longwood (Earlysville, Virginia)
 Longwood House (Farmville, Virginia), a historic home
 Longwood University in Farmville, Virginia
 Longwood Lancers, the school's athletics program
 Longwood (Gordonsville, Virginia)
 Longwood, Wisconsin, a town
 Longwood (community), Wisconsin, an unincorporated community

See also
 Battle of Longwoods
 Longwood Gardens in Kennett Square, Pennsylvania
 Longwood station (disambiguation)